In mathematics, especially group theory, the centralizer  (also called commutant) of a subset S in a group G is the set  of elements of G that commute with every element of S, or equivalently, such that conjugation by  leaves each element of S fixed. The normalizer of S in G is the set of elements  of G that satisfy the weaker condition of leaving the set  fixed under conjugation. The centralizer and normalizer of S are subgroups of G.  Many techniques in group theory are based on studying the centralizers and normalizers of suitable subsets S.

Suitably formulated, the definitions also apply to semigroups.

In ring theory, the centralizer of a subset of a ring is defined with respect to the semigroup (multiplication) operation of the ring. The centralizer of a subset of a ring R is a subring of R. This article also deals with centralizers and normalizers in a Lie algebra.

The idealizer in a semigroup or ring is another construction that is in the same vein as the centralizer and normalizer.

Definitions

Group and semigroup
The centralizer of a subset S of group (or semigroup) G is defined as

where only the first definition applies to semigroups.
If there is no ambiguity about the group in question, the G can be suppressed from the notation. When S = {a} is a singleton set, we write CG(a) instead of CG({a}). Another less common notation for the centralizer is Z(a), which parallels the notation for the center.  With this latter notation, one must be careful to avoid confusion between the center of a group G, Z(G), and the centralizer of an element g in G, Z(g).

The normalizer of S in the group (or semigroup) G is defined as

where again only the first definition applies to semigroups. The definitions are similar but not identical. If g is in the centralizer of S and s is in S, then it must be that , but if g is in the normalizer, then  for some t in S, with t possibly different from s. That is, elements of the centralizer of S must commute pointwise with S, but elements of the normalizer of S need only commute with S as a set. The same notational conventions mentioned above for centralizers also apply to normalizers. The normalizer should not be confused with the normal closure.

Ring, algebra over a field, Lie ring, and Lie algebra
If R is a ring or an algebra over a field, and S is a subset of R, then the centralizer of S is exactly as defined for groups, with R in the place of G.

The definition of centralizers for Lie rings is linked to the definition for rings in the following way. If R is an associative ring, then R can be given the bracket product . Of course then  if and only if . If we denote the set R with the bracket product as LR, then clearly the ring centralizer of S in R is equal to the Lie ring centralizer of S  in LR.

The normalizer of a subset S of a Lie algebra (or Lie ring)  is given by

Properties

Semigroups

Groups
Source:
 The centralizer and normalizer of S are both subgroups of G.
 Clearly, .
 CG(CG(S)) contains S, but CG(S) need not contain S. Containment occurs exactly when S is abelian.
 If H is a subgroup of G, then NG(H) contains H.
 If H is a subgroup of G, then the largest subgroup of G in which H is normal is the subgroup NG(H).
 If S is a subset of G such that all elements of S commute with each other, then the largest subgroup of G whose center contains S is the subgroup CG(S).
 The center of G is exactly  CG(G) and G is an abelian group if and only if .
 For singleton sets, .
 By symmetry, if S and T are two subsets of G,  if and only if .
 A subgroup H of a group G is said to be C-closed or self-bicommutant if  for some subset . If so, then in fact, .

Rings and algebras over a field
Source:
 Centralizers in rings and in algebras over a field are subrings and subalgebras over a field, respectively; centralizers in Lie rings and in Lie algebras are Lie subrings and Lie subalgebras, respectively.
 The normalizer of S in a Lie ring contains the centralizer of S.
 CR(CR(S)) contains S but is not necessarily equal. The double centralizer theorem deals with situations where equality occurs.
 If S is an additive subgroup of a Lie ring A, then NA(S) is the largest Lie subring of A in which S is a Lie ideal.
 If S is a Lie subring of a Lie ring A, then .

See also
 Commutator
 Double centralizer theorem
 Idealizer
 Multipliers and centralizers (Banach spaces)
 Stabilizer subgroup

Notes

References

Abstract algebra
Group theory
Ring theory
Lie algebras